Alexis de Tocqueville (1805–1859) was a French political thinker and historian.

Tocqueville may also refer to:

Tocqueville, Eure, France
Tocqueville, Manche, France 
Tocqueville-en-Caux, Seine-Maritime, France
Tocqueville-les-Murs, Seine-Maritime, France
Tocqueville-sur-Eu, Seine-Maritime, France
Alexis de Tocqueville Institution, a conservative think tank in the United States
Hippolyte Clérel de Tocqueville, senator of the French Third Republic